"Ordeal in Space" is a science fiction short story by American writer Robert A. Heinlein, originally published in Town & Country, May 1948. It is one of Heinlein's Future History stories, and appears in his collection  The Green Hills of Earth.

Plot summary
A spaceship's crewman is called to repair an antenna while his ship is still under spin. He is unable to hold on, despite supreme effort; he drifts away from the ship and has far too much time to ponder things. When he returns to Earth, he is unable to work as a spaceman and has a fear of heights. After living in fear and sadness for a time, he must face his troubles while rescuing a kitten stuck on the 35th-floor ledge of a building.

Heinlein includes a variant verse to the hymn Eternal Father, Strong to Save, dedicated "to those who venture into space," in the story. Originally titled "Broken Wings", the story was rejected by The Saturday Evening Post. A reading of this story was broadcast on BBC Radio 7 on July 14, 2007.

External links
Page at Internet Speculative Fiction Database

Short stories by Robert A. Heinlein
1948 short stories
Works originally published in Town & Country (magazine)